is an uninhabited volcanic island located in the Tokara Islands, part of the Kagoshima Prefecture, Japan.

Geography
No volcanic activity has been recorded in historic times.

The local climate is classified as subtropical, with a rainy season from May through September.

History
Kogajajima does not appear to have ever had permanent human habitation.

During the Ryukyu Kingdom era, the territory of the kingdom reached as far as Kogajajima island.

During the Edo period, Kogajajima was part of Satsuma Domain and was administered as part of Kawabe District. In 1896, the island was transferred to the administrative control of Ōshima District, Kagoshima, and from 1911 was administered as part of the village of Toshima, Kagoshima. From 1946 to 1952, the island was administered by the United States as part of the Provisional Government of Northern Ryukyu Islands.

See also

 List of volcanoes in Japan
 List of islands
 Desert island

References

National Geospatial Intelligence Agency (NGIA). Prostar Sailing Directions 2005 Japan Enroute. Prostar Publications (2005).

External links 
 

Tokara Islands
Volcanoes of Kagoshima Prefecture
Uninhabited islands of Japan
Stratovolcanoes of Japan
Islands of Kagoshima Prefecture